Artūrs Ņikiforenko (born 1 March 1992) is a Latvian heavyweight judoka and Brazilian Jiu Jitsu (BJJ) competitor. He competed at the 2016 Olympics, where he was eliminated in the first bout. In 2017 he won the European Championship (Brazilian jiu-jitsu).

References

External links

 
 

1992 births
Living people
Latvian male judoka
Olympic judoka of Latvia
Judoka at the 2016 Summer Olympics
Judoka at the 2015 European Games
European Games competitors for Latvia